Jeffrey Joaquin Cariaso is a Filipino-American coach and retired professional basketball player. He is the former head coach of the Converge FiberXers of the Philippine Basketball Association (PBA). He also played for various PBA teams, mostly with Alaska, for 15 seasons. He is known as "The Jet". He is also the basketball operations director of Slam Magazine Philippines.

Playing career

Alaska
He was first drafted by the Alaska Aces (then known as the Alaska Milkmen) during the 1995 PBA draft as the sixth overall. During his rookie year, he won the Rookie of the Year Award. And in only his second year in the league, he achieved a rare Grand Slam with the Aces where he was instrumental in that majestic championship run, scoring the winning free throws in the All-Filipino Cup final against the Purefoods Hotdogs.

Mobiline and Tanduay years
Before the start of the 1997 PBA season, Cariaso was traded to the Mobiline Phone Pals (now known as the TNT Tropang Texters) where he was a primary offensive threat for the team. They won the special 1998 Centennial Cup.

After his tenure with Mobiline, he was again sent to the expansion team Tanduay Rhum Masters. He bannered the team alongside Sonny Alvarado, Eric Menk and Rudy Hatfield.

Reunion with Johnny Abarrientos
After Tanduay folded in 2001, he was then picked by the Coca-Cola Tigers where he got reunited with Johnny Abarrientos. They won a couple of championships which include the 2002 All-Filipino Cup against his former team Alaska and the 2003 Reinforced Conference against San Miguel. He last tasted a championship with Talk 'N Text prior to this. He also received the most number of awards in his career during his tenure with the Tigers. Also, Coca-Cola was the only team that made it to the finals of all three conferences in 2003.

Return to Alaska and twilight years
In the middle of the 2004–05 PBA season, he along with Reynel Hugnatan were traded back to the Alaska Aces in exchange for all-stars John Arigo and Ali Peek.

Cariaso was the last active player remaining on that Alaska Grand Slam team of 1996.

In the semifinals of the 2010 PBA fiesta conference, he announced his retirement after playing 15 seasons in the league. His number 22 was also retired by the Alaska Aces and the Coca-Cola Tigers.

Coaching career

Barangay Ginebra 
On April 29, 2014, Cariaso was named as the new head coach of Barangay Ginebra, replacing Ato Agustin. Prior to this, he has no high-level head coaching experience. In fact, he has little coaching experience apart from San Mig Coffee, joining the team in 2011, one year after retiring as a player, to assist his former coach at Alaska, Tim Cone. At San Mig, he emerged as the top assistant, often taking over the reins when Cone was ejected, or when the team was getting blown out and the American coach wanted to send a message to his players.
His tenure as coach of the Gin Kings did not produce much success, as the team failed to go beyond the quarterfinal rounds in the 2014 Governors' Cup and in the 2014–15 Philippine Cup. Moreover, the triangle offense system he uses did not sit well with the players.
At the end of their Philippine Cup campaign, he was relieved of his coaching duties and was replaced by Ato Agustin. He still has one year and two conferences left in his contract, which was bought out, paving the way to his return to Alaska as assistant coach and camp director.

Converge FiberXers 
On August 9, 2022, after just one conference, Cariaso was released from his position.

Career statistics

|-
| align="left" | 1995
| align="left" | Alaska
| 73 || 27.6|| .484 || .207 || .803 || 3.9 || 1.5 || .7 || .1 || 11.4
|-
| align="left" | 1996
| align="left" | Alaska
| 69 || 29.6 || .493 || .125 || .807 || 4.3 || 2.0 || .5 || .3 || 11.8
|-
| align="left" | 1997
| align="left" | Alaska
| 39 || 38.6 || .425 || .208 || .766 || 7.0 || 4.0 || 1.0 || .1 || 18.7
|-
| align="left" | 1998
| align="left" | Mobiline
| 23 || 42.3 || .449 || .091 || .729 || 6.8 || 5.1 || .9 || .4 || 18.2
|-
| align="left" | 1999
| align="left" | Mobiline
| 35 || 36.1 || .398 || .318 || .789 || 5.2 || 3.8 || .7 || .3 || 13.2
|-
| align="left" | 2000
| align="left" | Tanduay
| 44 || 37.0 || .383 || .222 || .771 || 5.2 || 4.5 || .7 || .2 || 14.6
|-
| align="left" | 2001
| align="left" | Tanduay
| 35 || 36.3 || .427 || .299 || .812 || 5.1 || 3.1 || .7 || .2 || 18.4
|-
| align="left" | 2002
| align="left" | Coca-Cola
| 12 || 28.0 || .422 || .392 || .679 || 3.3 || 3.3 || 1.0 || .2 || 19.2
|-
| align="left" | 2003
| align="left" | Coca-Cola
| 65 || 33.0 || .405 || .232 || .841 || 4.3 || 3.7 || .8 || .1 || 15.4
|-
| align="left" | 2004–05
| align="left" | Coca-Cola/Alaska
| 71 || 34.0 || .418 || .377 || .866 || 4.6 || 3.9 || .7 || .1 || 15.8
|-
| align="left" | 2005–06
| align="left" | Alaska
| 49 || 34.7 || .414 || .288 || .797 || 4.7 || 3.1 || .6 || .1 || 12.5
|-
| align="left" | 2006–07
| align="left" | Alaska
| 45 || 34.2 || .445 || .308 || .866 || 4.6 || 3.0 || .6 || .0 || 13.1
|-
| align="left" | 2007–08
| align="left" | Alaska
| 45 || 29.6 || .400 || .349 || .763 || 4.3 || 3.0 || .6 || .1 || 10.4
|-
| align="left" | 2008–09
| align="left" | Alaska
| 40 || 21.6 || .399 || .275 || .774 || 2.9 || 2.1 || .3 || .0 || 7.1
|-
| align="left" | 2009–10
| align="left" | Alaska
| 41 || 10.8 || .356 || .111 || .696 || 1.3 || 1.1 || .1 || .1 || 2.8
|-
| align="left" | Career
| align="left" |
| 686 || 31.3 || .426 || .296 || .802 || 4.4 || 3.0 || .6 || .1 || 13.1

Personal life
Cariaso is engaged to sports news reporter Erika Padilla, who was two months pregnant with her first child when he proposed. He was previously married to Michelle, with whom he shares 4 children.  Jeffrey is a graduate of Mission High School in San Francisco, CA.

References

1972 births
Living people
Alaska Aces (PBA) players
Basketball players at the 2002 Asian Games
Filipino men's basketball coaches
Philippine Basketball Association All-Stars
Philippine Basketball Association players with retired numbers
Philippines men's national basketball team players
Filipino men's basketball players
Powerade Tigers players
Sonoma State Seawolves men's basketball players
Tanduay Rhum Masters players
TNT Tropang Giga players
Shooting guards
American men's basketball players
American sportspeople of Filipino descent
Asian Games competitors for the Philippines
American men's basketball coaches
Alaska Aces (PBA) draft picks
Magnolia Hotshots coaches
Alaska Aces (PBA) coaches
Converge FiberXers coaches
Barangay Ginebra San Miguel coaches